Farm to Market Roads in Texas are owned and maintained by the Texas Department of Transportation (TxDOT).

FM 3400

Farm to Market Road 3400 (FM 3400) is located in McLennan County.

FM 3400 begins at an intersection with FM 434 in Robinson. The highway travels north along University Parks Drive through more rural areas of the county and enters Waco near SH 6/Loop 340 before ending at another intersection with FM 434.

FM 3400 was designated on September 29, 1977, along the current route. On June 27, 1995, the entire route was redesignated Urban Road 3400 (UR 3400). The designation reverted to FM 3400 with the elimination of the Urban Road system on November 15, 2018.

FM 3401

Farm to Market Road 3401 (FM 3401) is located in Groesbeck in Limestone County.

The highway's southern terminus is at SH 14 (South Ellis Street) near Groesbeck Elementary and Middle Schools. FM 3401 runs northwest along Elwood Enge Drive before ending at FM 2489 (Big Hill Road).

FM 3401 was designated on September 29, 1977, on its current route.

FM 3402

Farm to Market Road 3402 (FM 3402) was located in DeWitt County. No highway currently uses the FM 3402 designation.

On October 26, 1983, the road was extended west  to US 87. FM 3402 was cancelled by district request on June 3, 1994, and became a portion of SH 72.

FM 3403

RM 3404

FM 3405

Farm to Market Road 3405 (FM 3405) is a  route in Williamson County.

It begins at US 183 north of Liberty Hill. The route travels to the east, and the north fork of the San Gabriel River lies to its south. The highway ends at RM 2338 northwest of the city of Georgetown and Lake Georgetown.

FM 3405 was designated along its current route on September 29, 1977.

FM 3406

Farm to Market Road 3406 (FM 3406) was located in Williamson County. It ran from I-35, north of Round Rock to a point 2.1 miles south and west.

FM 3406 was cancelled on March 26, 2020, and the road was given to the city of Round Rock.

FM 3407

Farm to Market Road 3407 (FM 3407) was located in Hays County. No highway currently uses the FM 3407 designation.

FM 3407 was designated on September 29, 1977, from FM 2439, 1.6 miles southwest of RM 12, southeast  to SH 123 south of San Marcos. After it was extended to RM 12, FM 3407 was cancelled on June 24, 2010, and redesignated as RM 12.

FM 3408

FM 3409

FM 3409 (1977)

FM 3409 was cancelled on March 19, 1980, at the request of officials of Aransas County and Rockport.

FM 3410

FM 3411

FM 3412

Farm to Market Road 3412 (FM 3412) was located in Collin County, wholly within the city limits of Wylie.

FM 3412 began at an intersection with FM 1378 in Wylie, heading east on two-lane undivided West Brown Street. The road headed through a mix of fields and woods with some commercial development. Farther east, the highway headed into residential areas with some businesses. FM 3412 crossed a Kansas City Southern railroad line before ending at FM 2514.

FM 3412 was designated on September 29, 1977, to run from FM 544 near Murphy east to SH 78 in Wylie. On January 9, 1978, the two highways switched alignments, with FM 3412 running from FM 1378 east to SH 78 in Wylie. FM 3412 was redesignated Urban Road 3412 (UR 3412) on June 27, 1995. The section of FM 3412 from FM 1378 to FM 2514 was cancelled on November 20, 2008. The remainder of the route was transferred to FM 2514 on May 28, 2009.

FM 3413

FM 3414

FM 3415

FM 3416

FM 3417

FM 3418

FM 3419

FM 3420

Farm to Market Road 3420 (FM 3420) was located in Hidalgo County. No highway currently uses the FM 3420 designation.

On August 29, 1989, the road was extended south  to FM 3362. On June 27, 1995, the entire route was transferred to Urban Road 3420 (UR 3420). The route was cancelled on December 22, 1997, by district request, and its mileage was transferred to FM 3362.

FM 3421

FM 3422

FM 3423

Farm to Market Road 3423 (FM 3423) is located in Bell County in the town of Harker Heights. The highway is known locally as Indian Trail.

FM 3423 begins at a junction with I-14 / US 190 near a retail center. North of Clore Road, the highway travels through a less developed area of the town before ending at an intersection with Bus. US 190.

FM 3423 was designated on October 21, 1981, along its current route. On June 27, 1995, the entire route was redesignated Urban Road 3423 (UR 3423). The designation reverted to FM 3423 with the elimination of the Urban Road system on November 15, 2018.

FM 3424

FM 3425

FM 3426

FM 3427

FM 3428

Farm to Market Road 3428 (FM 3428) is located in Montague County to FM 2634. It begins at an intersection with Gilbert Road west of Lake Nocona, where the road heads south as Keck Reynolds Road. From this intersection, the highway heads north to an intersection with FM 1106, which heads east to provide access to Lake Nocona, before ending at a junction with FM 2634. North of this intersection, the road continues north as Carpenter Road.

FM 3428 was designated on October 21, 1981, along the current rotue.

FM 3429

FM 3430

FM 3431

Farm to Market Road 3431 (FM 3431) is located in Lubbock County.

FM 3431 begins at an intersection with FM 1585 near a winery. The highway travels north through a mostly rural area of the county just outside of Lubbock. FM 3431 enters the Lubbock city limits and ends at an intersection with US 84 near the Montford Unit.

FM 3431 was designated on October 27, 1994, along the current route.

FM 3431 (1981)

Another section from Sandlin Community east  to FM 1835 was designated on October 23, 1983, creating a gap. FM 3431 was cancelled on October 7, 1987, with the mileage being transferred to FM 1835.

FM 3432

FM 3433

FM 3434

FM 3435

FM 3436

Farm to Market Road 3436 (FM 3436) is located in Galveston County. It runs from FM 517 in Texas City to FM 646 (future SH 99) near Bacliff.

FM 3436 was designated on January 28, 1982, from FM 517 and Avenue B in San Leon south to FM 517 in Texas City as a replacement of a section of FM 517. On July 20, 1982, a 5.9 mile section from FM 517 in Texas City to FM 646 near Bacliff was transferred to FM 646. On June 30, 1995, the entire route was transferred to UR 3436, but was changed back to FM 3436 on November 15, 2018.

FM 3437

FM 3438

Farm to Market Road 3438 (FM 3438) is located on the west side of Abilene. FM 3438 begins at U.S. Highway 277 (US 277) near the Quail Hollow subdivision and travels to the north and passes to the east of Dyess Air Force Base before ending at I-20. A section of FM 3438 has frontage roads. They are located between Hartford Street to US 84 for the northbound lanes, and between Military Drive and US 84 on the southbound lanes. These frontage roads are a continuation of the frontage roads on eastbound US 84.

FM 3438 was designated on September 22, 1982, from US 277 northward  to the south end of Spur 312. On August 18, 1987, FM 3438 was extended north  to Loop 355 (now Business I-20), replacing Spur 312. On August 29, 1989, FM 3438 was extended north to I-20, completing its current route.

On June 27, 1995, the section from I-20 to US 277 was redesignated Urban Road 3438 (UR 3438). The designation of this section reverted to FM 3438 with the elimination of the Urban Road system on November 15, 2018.

In 2008 TxDOT began reconstruction of the intersection of FM 3438 & US 84, which was turned into an interchange. 

Junction list

FM 3439

FM 3440

FM 3441

FM 3442

Farm to Market Road 3442 (FM 3442) is located in the southern portion of Cooke County. FM 3442 begins at FM 3002 and travels to the south before ending at the Denton County line, whereupon it continues as a local road for approximately 1/4 mile before ending at another local road.

FM 3442 was designated on October 26, 1983, on its current route.

FM 3443

FM 3444

Farm to Market Road 3444 (FM 3444) was located in Wilson County. No highway currently uses the FM 3444 designation.

FM 3444 was designated on October 26, 1983, from US 181 southwest  to FM 1303 at Canada Verde. On February 24, 1994, FM 3444 was cancelled by district request and transferred to FM 775.

FM 3445

FM 3446

FM 3447

FM 3448

FM 3449

FM 3450

FM 3451

FM 3451 (1983)

The original FM 3451 was designated on October 26, 1983, from FM 2412, 1 mile east of Levita, north  to SH 36, but was cancelled on August 29, 1984, after Coryell County court voted in December 1983 to discontinue the project.

FM 3452

FM 3453

FM 3454

FM 3455

FM 3456

FM 3457

FM 3458

FM 3459

FM 3460

FM 3461

FM 3462

FM 3463

Farm to Market Road 3463 (FM 3463) is located in Menard County.

FM 3463 was designated on January 9, 1984, along the current route as a redesignation of a portion of FM 1223 when the middle section of FM 1223 was cancelled.

FM 3464

Farm to Market Road 3464 (FM 3464) was located in Webb County. No highway currently uses the FM 3464 designation.

FM 3464 was designated on October 26, 1983, from FM 1472, 2.5 miles northwest of Laredo, east  to I-35. On April 1, 1988, the road was extended east , replacing FM 3488. On June 30, 1995, the entire route was transferred to UR 3464. UR 3464 was cancelled on June 29, 2000: the section from 0.33 mile west of I-35 west to UR 1472 was returned to Laredo and the remainder of UR 3464 became Loop 20.

FM 3465

FM 3466

FM 3467

Farm to Market Road 3467 (FM 3467) was located in Bell County. No highway currently uses the FM 3467 designation.

FM 3467 was designated on June 21, 1984, from US 190 and Loop 121 west of Belton, northeast  to FM 439. On July 10, 1989, FM 3467 was cancelled and transferred to Loop 121.

FM 3468

FM 3468 (1984)

The original FM 3468 was designated on July 24, 1984, from Loop 1604, 2.9 miles south of US 87, southeast 1.6 miles to the Wilson County line. FM 3468 was cancelled on March 30, 1988, by district request and transferred to FM 3432.

FM 3469

FM 3470

Farm to Market Road 3470 (FM 3470) is located in Bell County in the city of Killeen. The highway is known locally as the Stan Schlueter Loop.

FM 3470 begins at an intersection with SH 201 near the Killeen–Fort Hood Regional Airport. The highway runs through an area that features a mix of residential and commercial properties and has a junction with SH 195. FM 3470 continues to run through commercial and residential areas and has a junction with I-14 / US 190 just before ending at an intersection with FM 2410.

On June 27, 1995, the entire route was redesignated Urban Road 3470 (UR 3470). The section of highway along Clear Creek Road was transferred to SH 201 on January 31, 2002. The designation of the remaining section reverted to FM 3470 with the elimination of the Urban Road system on November 15, 2018.

Junction list

FM 3471

FM 3472

FM 3473

Farm to Market Road 3473 (FM 3473) was located in Franklin County. No highway currently uses the FM 3473 designation.

The highway was cancelled on February 27, 1997, with the mileage being transferred to SH 37.

RM 3474

Ranch to Market 3474 (RM 3474) is a  route in Hutchinson County. It is the shortest route of the Ranch to Market system.

The western terminus of RM 3474 is along Par Avenue northwest of Borger. The route runs eastward, just north of the Borger city limits, before ending at a junction with SH 136/SH 152/SH 207.

RM 3474 was designated on April 29, 1986, along its current route.

FM 3475

FM 3476

FM 3477

FM 3478

FM 3479

Farm to Market Road 3479 (FM 3479) is located in northern Fort Worth in Tarrant County.

FM 3479 begins at FM 156. It travels east along Harmon Road before turning to the north and ending at an interchange with the US 81/US 287 freeway.

FM 3479 was designated on December 22, 1986, along its current route. The route was redesignated Urban Road 3479 (UR 3479) on June 27, 1995. The designation reverted to FM 3479 with the elimination of the Urban Road system on November 15, 2018.

FM 3480

FM 3481

FM 3482

FM 3483

FM 3484

FM 3485

Farm to Market Road 3485 (FM 3485) was located in Collin County. No highway currently uses the FM 3485 designation.

FM 3485 was designated on April 30, 1987, from FM 1378 west  to FM 2551. On April 24, 2003, FM 3485 was cancelled by district request and removed from the highway system as the county was unable to secure right-of-way for the route. The highway would have followed West Lucas Road.

FM 3486

FM 3487
Farm to Market Road 3487 (FM 3487) is a designation that has been used twice. No highway currently uses the FM 3487 designation.

FM 3487 (1987)

The route was cancelled and combined with FM 2042 on August 4, 1988.

FM 3487 (1988)

The second FM 3487 was designated on December 30, 1988, running from FM 471 to I-410/SH 16. The highway was internally re-designated as Urban Road 3487 by TxDOT on June 27, 1995. The designation was canceled on December 18, 2014, and control was returned to the city of San Antonio as part of TxDOT's San Antonio turnback program, which gave 21.8 miles of roads to the city.

Junction list

FM 3488

FM 3488 (1987)

FM 3488 was cancelled on April 1, 1988, and transferred to FM 3464 (now Loop 20).

FM 3489

FM 3490

FM 3491

FM 3492

FM 3493

Farm to Market Road 3493 (FM 3493) was located in Wharton County. No highway currently uses the FM 3493 designation.

FM 3493 was designated on April 30, 1987, from SH 60 south  to FM 1299. On October 28, 1991, FM 3493 was cancelled by district request and transferred to FM 1299 when it was rerouted.

FM 3494

FM 3495

FM 3496

FM 3497

FM 3498

FM 3499

References

+34
Farm to market roads 3401
Farm to Market Roads 3401